Kiruthiga Udhayanidhi is an Indian film director. She is the wife of Udhayanidhi Stalin, and editor of the literary magazine called Inbox 1305.

Career 
Kiruthiga started her career with the directorial debut Vanakkam Chennai. The movie produced by Udhayanidhi Stalin, starred Shiva and Priya Anand.  In February 2017, she directed a music video "Sadhayai Meeri"  composed by Santhosh Narayanan which portrays the pains of transgender people. She later directed Kaali (2018).

Personal life 
Kiruthiga married Udhayanidhi Stalin in 2002 and the couple have a son and a daughter. Their son Inban has signed for NEROCA FC football club which plays in the I-League.

Filmography

References 

Film directors from Chennai
Indian atheists
Indian women film directors
Living people
Year of birth missing (living people)